Ambadi Thannilorunni is a 1986 Indian Malayalam film, directed by Alleppey Ranganath and produced by C. S. Abraham. The film stars Jagathy Sreekumar, Anand, Vinayan and C. S. Abraham in the lead roles. The film has musical score by Alleppey Ranganath. The movie takes its title from a song in the 1972 movie Chembarathi.

Cast
Jagathy Sreekumar
Anand as Deepu
Vinayan
C. S. Abraham
M. G. Soman
Minumohan
Santhakumari
Soumini as Stella

Soundtrack
The music was composed by Alleppey Ranganath and the lyrics were written by Muttar Sasikumar.

References

External links
 

1986 films
1980s Malayalam-language films